159P/LONEOS is a periodic comet in the Solar System.

References

External links 
 Orbital simulation from JPL (Java) / Horizons Ephemeris
 159P/LONEOS – Seiichi Yoshida @ aerith.net
 159P at Kronk's Cometography

Periodic comets
0159
Comets in 2018